rDock (previously RiboDock) is an open-source molecular docking software that be used for docking small molecules against proteins and nucleic acids. It is primarily designed for high-throughput virtual screening and prediction of binding mode.

History 
The development of rDock started in 1998 in RiboTargets (later Vernalis (R&D) Ltd). The software was originally called RiboDock. The development went on until 2006 when the software was licensed to University of York for academic distribution and also maintenance.

Six years later, in 2012, Vernalis and University of York decided to release rDock as open-source software to allow its further development by the wider community. The version that was released as open source is developed and supported by University of Barcelona on SourceForge. The development on SourceForge stalled after June 2014 and the repository is considered deprecated after the migration to GitHub.

A fork named RxDock continued the development of rDock from April 2019 until March 2022 on GitLab. As of April 2022, the RxDock project development activity is very low.

See also 
Docking (molecular)
Virtual screening
List of protein-ligand docking software

References

External links 
rDock - The Molecular Docking Platform (University of York)
rDock - A Fast, Versatile and Open Source Program for Docking Ligands to Proteins and Nucleic Acids (SourceForge)
RxDock (fork of rDock)
Barril Lab Software (University of Barcelona)

Molecular modelling software
Molecular modelling
Free and open-source software